The Association of Moving Image Archivists (AMIA) is a 501(c)(3) not-for-profit organization established to advance the field of moving image archiving by fostering cooperation among individuals and organizations concerned with the acquisition, description, preservation, exhibition and use of moving image materials.

History

Since the late 1960s, representatives from moving image archives have recognized the value of regular meetings to exchange practical information and experiences. Over the years, this group of archivists originally known as the Film and Television Archives Advisory Committee (F/TAAC) expanded from a handful of participants to several hundred archivists from over 100 national, regional and local institutions. In 1990, the name of the group was changed to the Association of Moving Image Archivists. In 1991, AMIA voted to formalize as an individual-based member-based professional association, the only one of its kind in the moving image archival field. Although AMIA's office is based in the US, its membership is now drawn from across the world.

Membership
Membership is open to anyone who has an interest in the preservation of moving images and associated sound recordings: in practice, most of the membership are professional archivists (both public sector and commercial) and people working in associated professions, e.g. librarianship, the film and television industry or academics in related fields.  AMIA offers both individual and institutional membership.

Governing structure
AMIA is governed by a Board of Directors, which is elected by the membership on a two-year cycle, and chaired by a president.  The Board oversees and ratifies the work of the sub-groups through which the work of the organization is undertaken.  The last significant changes to the governing structure were undertaken in 2009, when the present structure of committees and task forces was introduced.

Current President
 2021–Present: Rachael Stoeltje

Former Presidents
 2018–2021: Dennis Doros
 2016–2017: Andrea Kalas
2012–2015: Caroline Frick
 2009–2011: Wendy Shay
 2005–2009: Janice L. Simpson
 2003–2005: Milt Shefter
 1999–2003: Sam Kula
 1997–1999: Linda Tadic
 1996–1997: Andrea Kalas
 1995–1996: Maxine Fleckner Ducey
 1994–1995: Eddie Richmond
 1993–1994: Ernest Dick
 1992–1993: Chris Horak
 1991–1992: Bill Murphy

Committees and Task Forces

AMIA is a volunteer based organization and projects rely on work done by its members in Committees and Task Forces.

 Committees of the Board carry out the core management and policymaking functions of AMIA, e.g. running elections and organizing the conference.  Chairs are appointed directly by the Board of Directors, and although their members are volunteers drawn from within the wider AMIA membership, the rosters of Committees of the Board have to be approved by the Board.
 Committees of the Membership are the bodies through which AMIA's professional presence in the field exists.  They develop expertise, advocacy and education in the different topics and activities related to moving image archiving, e.g. preservation, copyright and cataloguing.  Their rosters are volunteers from within the AMIA membership, and they elect their chairs directly.
 Task Forces are created by the Board of Directors to carry out a specific projects which does not fall squarely within the remit of an existing committee, and are dissolved on completion of that task.

See also
 Coordinating Council of Audiovisual Archives Association
 UNESCO Memory of the World
 UNESCO World Day for Audiovisual Heritage
 National Film Preservation Foundation
 Film preservation
 Optical media preservation
 Lost film
 Orphan film

References

Film archives in the United States
Film organizations in the United States
Television archives in the United States
Television organizations in the United States
Non-profit organizations based in California
Organizations established in 1990
Archivist associations
History organizations based in the United States